Ranulf I (also Ramnulf, Rannulf, and Ranulph) (820–866) was a Count of Poitiers (from 835) and Duke of Aquitaine (from 852). He is the son of Gerard, Count of Auvergne. Few details are known about Ranulf I, except that he died in 866 in Aquitaine from wounds received in the Battle of Brissarthe against the Vikings (in which Robert the Strong also died).

Marriage and issue
Ranulf married Adeltrude of Maine, a daughter of Rorgon I, and they had the following:
Ranulf II, who inherited Poitou and later acquired Aquitaine.
Gauzbert, (d. 893)
Ebalus (d.892) abbot of St. Germain-des-Pres and St. Hilary of Poitiers

See also
Ramnulfids
Dukes of Aquitaine family tree

Notes

References

Sources

820 births
866 deaths
House of Poitiers
Dukes of Aquitaine
Counts of Poitiers